Hurler or Hurlers may refer to:
 someone who hurls, especially
 a player of hurling, Irish stick-and-ball sport
 a pitcher in baseball
 Hurler (roller coaster), name of a roller coaster found at Carowinds and formerly Kings Dominion amusement park in the United States
 Hurler syndrome, genetic disorder also known as mucopolysaccharidosis type I (MPS I), Hurler's disease, or gargoylism
 The Hurlers (stone circles), prehistoric monument in Cornwall, UK

See also
 Hurlers Cross, village in County Clare, Ireland
 Hurler–Scheie syndrome or mucopolysaccharidosis type I H-S
 Pseudo-Hurler polydystrophy, or mucolipidosis III (ML III)